The Fateh Mobin is an Iranian single-stage solid propelled Terminal Infrared homing dual surface-to-surface and anti-ship short-range ballistic missile. It was first unveiled on a military parade in Tehran on 13 August 2018 two days after American media reported it. It is an upgraded version of the Fateh-110 with better guidance. The Iranians plan on using its guidance systems on the Zolfaghar SRBM which some sources suggest does have a poor guidance system.

Characteristics
In the words of Iranian defense minister Amir Hatami the missile is purely indigenous, low-observable and precision guided. The missile is thought to be a variant of the Fateh-110 with only a better guidance system and same range of 200-300 km. The missile probably has Terminal guidance through Imaging Infrared which explains its nose cone. A missile with such guidance itself is radar-evasive. The missile has a length of just 9 m which means that it can be loaded in sea containers to be launched from sea platforms.

See also 
 Fateh-110
 List of military equipment manufactured in Iran
 Science and technology in Iran

References 

Weapons of Syria
Short-range ballistic missiles of Iran
Surface-to-surface missiles of Iran
Tactical ballistic missiles of Iran
Theatre ballistic missiles
Military equipment introduced in the 2010s